Goosebumps Most Wanted is a line of Goosebumps books by author R.L. Stine, described as "a brand new take on terror."

Description
This line features a new recurring story arc, the 4th since the two-arc Goosebumps HorrorLand and Goosebumps Hall of Horrors. Featuring the return of several of the series' most infamous villains, the new series launched in October 2012.

"The infamous, Most Wanted Goosebumps characters are out on the loose and they're coming after you! There is no place to hide. Nothing is safe!" "Catch the most wanted Goosebumps characters--undead or alive..."

Books
{| class="wikitable" style="width:100%;"
|-
!  style="width:30px; background:#58c035; color:#fff;"|# !!  style="background:#58c035;color:#fff;"|Title !!  style="width:160px; background:#58c035; color:#fff;"|Original published date !! style="background:#58c035;color:#fff;"|Pages !!  style="width:120px; background:#58c035;"|ISBN

|-
! style="background:#58c035;color:#fff;" colspan="5"| Special Edition
|-

|}

References

External links

  at Scholastic Press

Book series introduced in 2012
Goosebumps